Don Michael Mitchell (March 17, 1943 – December 8, 2013) was an American actor, best known for appearing with Raymond Burr in the NBC television series Ironside (1967-1975). Mitchell played the role of Mark Sanger, and reprised the role in the made-for-TV "reunion" film in 1993, which was noted as his last television appearance.

Early life and career
Mitchell, who was a native of Houston, grew up on his grandfather's farm. He "excelled in both football and basketball" at his high school 
in Houston. His postsecondary education began at Los Angeles City College, from which he transferred to the University of California, Los Angeles, where he studied acting. His acting at UCLA led to his role in Ironside, as producer Collier Young saw Mitchell on stage in a production of Poor Bitos and signed him for the show 3 weeks before production began. Mitchell's other television roles include McMillan & Wife and playing Ed Lawrence on the CBS daytime soap opera Capitol. He also appeared as a policeman in Bewitched and Dr. Samson on Wonder Woman. He also co-starred in the film Scream Blacula Scream (1973).

Personal life and death
From 1969 to 1970, Mitchell was married to the model Emilie Blake, with whom he had a daughter, Dawn Mitchell. In 1972, Mitchell married actress Judy Pace, later divorcing in 1984. Together, Mitchell and Pace have two daughters, actress Julia Pace Mitchell, who appears on the CBS daytime soap opera The Young and the Restless, and attorney Shawn Meshelle Mitchell. Mitchell died of natural causes at his home in Encino, Los Angeles on December 8, 2013, at age 70.

References

External links
 
 Obituary Los Angeles Times

1943 births
2013 deaths
Male actors from Houston
American male film actors
American male television actors